This is a list of Romanian Jews who are or were Jewish or of Jewish ancestry.

Academics
 Aaron Aaronsohn, botanist
 J. J. Benjamin, historian
 Martin Bercovici, energy engineer
 Randolph L. Braham, political scientist, historian
 Nicolae Cajal, virologist and Jewish community leader
 Gedeon Dagan, hydrologist
 Constantin Dobrogeanu-Gherea, sociologist and Marxist theorist
 Lazăr Edeleanu, chemist
 Zicman Feider, biologist, acarologist
 Herman Finer, political scientist
Peter Freund, theoretical physicist
 Moses Gaster, hakham (Sephardi scholar & Rabi), linguist (Hebrew, Romanian), early Zionist leader
 Lucien Goldmann, philosopher, critic, sociologist
 Alexandru Graur, linguist
 Michael Harsgor, historian
 Joseph M. Juran, industrial engineer
 Ernest Klein, linguist
 Charles H. Kremer, dentist and war-crimes investigation activist
 Liviu Librescu, physicist
 Mario Livio, astrophysicist
 Edward Luttwak, economist and historian
 Norman Manea, writer and college professor
 Meinhard E. Mayer, physicist
 Serge Moscovici, social psychologist
 Victor Neumann, historian and political analyst
 Andrei Oișteanu, historian and anthropologist
 Zigu Ornea, literary critic
 Julius Popper, explorer
 Lazăr Șăineanu, (Eliezer Schein) linguist and folklorist
 Itamar Singer (1946–2012), Israeli historian
 Heimann Hariton Tiktin, linguist
 Vladimir Tismăneanu, historian and political analyst
 David Wechsler, psychologist
 Avram Leib Zissu, political leader, Zionist activist, author, opinion journalist

Mathematicians
 Peter Constantin, mathematician
 David Emmanuel, mathematician
 Murray Gerstenhaber (born 1927), mathematician and lawyer
 Sergiu Hart, mathematician, economist
 George Lusztig, mathematician
 Sergiu Klainerman, mathematician
 Solomon Marcus, mathematician
 Isaac Jacob Schoenberg, mathematician

Artists
 Avigdor Arikha, painter
 Victor Brauner, painter and photographer
 Sorel Etrog, sculptor
 André François, painter and graphic artist 
 Idel Ianchelevici, sculptor
 Marcel Iancu, architect and painter
 Iosif Iser, painter
 Isidore Isou, Letterist
 Alex Leon, painter
 Moissaye Marans, sculptor
 M. H. Maxy, painter
 Constantin Daniel Rosenthal, painter
 Reuven Rubin, painter
 Herman Sachs, muralist
 Arthur Segal, painter
 Saul Steinberg, cartoonist
 Hedda Sterne, painter, sculptor and graphic artist
 Nicolae Vermont, painter and graphic artist
 Jean Weinberg, photographer
 Medi Dinu, painter

Business people
 Max Auschnitt, financier
 Emil Calmanovici, financier and communist activist
 Safra Catz, business executive
 Solomon Leibovici, financier
 Eduardo Saverin (grandson of a Romanian Jew), co-founder of Facebook

Film and stage figures
 Israil Bercovici, playwright
 Lauren Bacall, actress
 Lucian Bratu, director/film producer 
 Christian Calson, director/writer
 Winona Ryder, actress
 Natalie Portman, actress, director
 I.A.L. Diamond, screenwriter
 Abraham Goldfaden, founder of Yiddish-language theater
 Marin Karmitz, director, producer
 Elina Löwensohn, actress
 Sigmund Mogulesko
Maia Morgenstern (1962 - ) film and stage actress
 Bernard Natan, film producer
 Ovitz family, circus actors and traveling musicians
 Edward G. Robinson, actor
 Abba Schoengold
 Dumitru Solomon, playwright
 Jacob Sternberg, director

Miscellaneous
 Iancu Țucărman, Holocaust and Iași pogrom survivor

Musicians
 Art Garfunkel, composer, singer-songwriter
 Dana International, Israeli singer and musician
 Shlomo Artzi, musician now living in Israel
 Dan Bittman, singer
 Alexander Uriah Boskovich, composer
 Dumitru Bughici composer, pianist
 Sergiu Comissiona, conductor, violinist
 Alma Gluck, soprano
 Sarah Gorby singer
 Clara Haskil, pianist
 Philip Herschkowitz, music theorist and composer
 Gabriel Iranyi, composer
 Mindru Katz, pianist
 Max Leibowitz violinist and bandleader
 Sammy Lerner, composer
 Yoel Levi, conductor
 Sergiu Luca, violinist
 Radu Lupu, pianist
 Silvia Marcovici, violinist
 Ion Marin, conductor
 Abraham Moskowitz, singer and theatre actor
 Joseph Moskowitz, klezmer musician
 Moishe Oysher, cantor and singer
 Simon Paskal singer, cantor and theatre actor
 Mendi Rodan. conductor, composer and violinist.
 Beverly Sills, opera singer

Political figures
 Martin Abern, Trotskyist activist
 Colette Avital, Israeli politician
 Davicion Bally, public servant
 Olga Bancic, communist activist 
 Silviu Brucan, communist politician and dissident
 Simion Bughici, communist politician
 Avram Bunaciu, communist politician
 Iosif Chișinevschi, communist politician
 Alexandru Dobrogeanu-Gherea, communist activist
 Mișu Dulgheru, communist activist, spy
 Miriam Eshkol, wife of Israeli Prime Minister Levi Eshkol
 Max Goldstein, communist activist
 Michael Howard, British politician
 Serge Klarsfeld, anti-Nazi activist
 David Korner, Trotskyist activist
 Alex Kozinski, judge
 Leon Lichtblau, communist activist
 Samuel Leibowitz, attorney
 Vasile Luca, communist politician
 Gheorghe Gaston Marin, communist politician
 Nati Meir, politician
 Ghiță Moscu, communist activist and politician
 Alexandru Nicolschi, communist politician
 Ana Pauker, communist politician
 Marcel Pauker, communist politician
 Mircea Răceanu, diplomat and dissident (Jewish father)
 Leonte Răutu, communist politician
 Valter Roman, communist politician
 Petre Roman, politician (Jewish father)
 Leonte Tismăneanu, communist politician
 Ghizela Vass, communist activist

Religious figures
 Moses Gaster, rabbi, philologist, community leader, early Zionist
 David L. Genuth, rabbi
 Ernest Klein, rabbi
 Moses Rosen, rabbi
 Moses Josef Rubin, rabbi
 Alexandru Șafran, rabbi
 Meir Shapiro, rabbi
 Nicolae Steinhardt, Christian Orthodox monk (Jewish father)
 Richard Wurmbrand, minister of religion

Sportspeople

Baseball

 Harry Feldman
 Hank Greenberg
 Bud Selig
 Kevin Youkilis

Basketball
 Ernie Grunfeld, Romania-born US, NBA 6' 6" guard/forward & GM, Olympic champion

Boxing
 Victor Zilberman, boxer

Canoeing
 Leon Rotman, sprint canoer, 2x Olympic champion (C-1 10,000 meter, C-1 1,000-meter) and bronze (C-1 1,000-meter), 14 national titles

Chess
 Abraham Baratz, chess player
 Alexandru Tyroler, chess player
 Bernardo Wexler, chess player

Fencing
 Andre Spitzer,  fencing master and coach

Soccer (association football)
 Itay Shechter, soccer player
 Avi Strool, soccer player
 Samuel Zauber, late soccer player 
 Rudolf Wetzer, late soccer player
 Jack Moisescu, late soccer player 
 Elemer Hirsch, late soccer player
 Norberto Höfling, late soccer player

Table tennis
 Angelica Rozeanu (Adelstin), Romania/Israel, 17x world champion, ITTFHoF

Writers
 Aharon Appelfeld (1932–2018), novelist and Holocaust survivor
 Iuliu Barasch, physician and writer
 Zelig Bardichever, poet and songwriter
 Max Blecher, writer
 Srul Bronshtein, poet
 Nina Cassian, poet
 Paul Celan, poet
 Andrei Codrescu, poet and essayist
 Vladimir Colin, short story writer and novelist
 Benjamin Fondane, poet, playwright, and literary critic
 Abraham Goldfaden, poet and playwright
 Zeydl Shmuel-Yehuda Helman, songwriter, journalist and actor
 D. Iacobescu, poet
 Isidore Isou, poet
 Irving Layton, poet
 Stan Lee (1922–2018) born Stanley Martin Lieber, writer, editor, publisher, and co-creator of most of the Marvel Comics Universe. 
 Gherasim Luca, poet
 Isac Ludo, novelist
 Norman Manea, novelist
 Cilibi Moise, storyteller and humorist
 Florin Mugur, author (poetry, prose, essays)
 Sașa Pană, poet and short story writer
 Maurice Samuel, novelist
 Elias Schwarzfeld, historian and novelist
 Mihail Sebastian, playwright
 Nicolae Steinhardt, writer (Jewish father)
 Alexandru Toma, poet
 Tristan Tzara, poet and essayist, founder of Dadaism 
 Tudor Vianu, literary critic
 Ilarie Voronca, poet and essayist
 Elie Wiesel, writer
 Haralamb Zincă (Hary Isac Zilberman), writer
 Gellu Naum, poet, dramatist, novelist, children's writer, and translator (Jewish Mother, Maria Naum née Rosa Gluck)

See also
History of the Jews in Romania
:Category:American people of Romanian-Jewish descent

References

Romanian
 
Jews
Jews,Romanian